Monarch Alternative Capital LP is an opportunistic credit manager with offices in New York, London, and West Palm Beach. For over 30 years, professionals at Monarch have invested across various market segments including corporate, real estate, structured credit, government debt, and special situations. Monarch’s goal is to deliver results for clients. The culture of partnership and transparency, driven by the collaborative spirit of Monarch employees, accentuates beneficial relationships with the firm's global and diverse investors, companies, operating partners, and advisors.

References

External links
 

Financial services companies of the United States
2002 establishments in the United States